Anhalt-Zerbst was a district in Saxony-Anhalt, Germany. It is bounded by (from the north and clockwise) the districts Potsdam-Mittelmark (Brandenburg) and Wittenberg, the city of Dessau and the districts of Köthen, Schönebeck and Jerichower Land.

History 
While Zerbst is a small town today, together with Dessau it was one of the two central cities of Anhalt. When the state of Anhalt was dissolved in 1603, one of the successor states was the principality of Anhalt-Zerbst. It was a small state with almost no political power. In 1793 the line of the princes became extinct, and Anhalt-Zerbst was annexed by the neighbouring principality of Anhalt-Dessau.

The present district was established in 1994 by merging the former districts of Zerbst and Roßlau with parts of the former district of Gräfenhainichen. Its borders are roughly identical with the ancient principality.

The district of Anhalt-Zerbst was dissolved in 2007 and divided into the new districts of Anhalt-Bitterfeld, Jerichower Land and Wittenberg.

Catherine II of Russia was by birth a princess of Anhalt-Zerbst.

Geography 
Anhalt-Zerbst comprises plain countryside north of the Elbe River. The Elbe enters the district in the east, runs through the southeastern part and then forms the southern and western border of Anhalt-Zerbst. The Elbe banks within the district are part of the Biosphere Reserve Middle Elbe. The north is occupied by the southern portions of the Fläming plateau.

Coat of arms

Towns and municipalities

See also 
 Principality of Anhalt-Zerbst

External links 
Official Website (German)
Map of Saxony and Anhalt in 1789

States and territories established in 1603
States and territories disestablished in 2007
History of Anhalt
1603 establishments in the Holy Roman Empire
2007 disestablishments in Germany